Erode was a state assembly constituency in Tamil Nadu, India. Post delimitation in 2008, the constituency ceased to exist and was replaced by two constituencies namely Erode East and Erode West.

Members of Legislative Assembly

Election results

2006

2001

1996

1991

1989

1984

1980

1977

1971

1967

1962

1957

1952

References

External links
 

Former assembly constituencies of Tamil Nadu
Erode